Mamiko Matsumoto (born 9 October 1997) is a Japanese professional footballer who plays as a goalkeeper for WE League club MyNavi Sendai.

Club career 
Matsumoto made her WE League debut on 12 September 2021.

References

External links 
 
 
Japan Football Association

WE League players
Living people
1997 births
Japanese women's footballers
Mynavi Vegalta Sendai Ladies players
Association football people from Chiba Prefecture
Women's association football goalkeepers